The 2019–20 season was Huddersfield Town's 111th year in existence and their first season back in the EFL Championship after relegation from the Premier League. Along with competing in the Championship, the club also participated in the FA Cup and the EFL Cup.

The season covered the period from 1 July 2019 to 22 July 2020.

Technical staff

First team players

New contracts

Transfers

Transfers in

Loans in

Transfers out

Loans out

Pre-season
In June 2019. HTAFC announced their pre-season schedule.

Competitions

Overview

Championship

League table

Results summary

Results by matchday

Matches
On 20 June 2019, the EFL Championship fixtures were revealed.

FA Cup

The third round draw was made live on BBC Two from Etihad Stadium, Micah Richards and Tony Adams conducted the draw.

EFL Cup

The first round draw was made on 20 June.

Squad statistics

Awards

Huddersfield Town Blue & White Foundation Player of the Month Award

Awarded monthly to the player that was chosen by members of the Blue & White Foundation voting on htafc.com

References

Huddersfield Town A.F.C. seasons
Huddersfield Town